Solon is a city in southeastern Cuyahoga County, Ohio, United States. A suburb of Cleveland, it is part of the Cleveland metropolitan area. According to the 2020 census, the population of Solon was 24,262.

The city has been recognized by Money in its list of "Best Places to Live", placing 23rd in 2009, 3rd in 2011, and 10th in 2015. The city has been rated as one of the safest in Ohio, has a highly rated public school system, and was ranked as one of the "best places to raise kids" by Bloomberg Businessweek. Solon has a strong economy, and in 2013 and 2014, was granted a Google eCity award recognizing it as the city with the strongest online business community in Ohio.

History
In 1820, the first settlers arrived from Connecticut to live in part of the Connecticut Western Reserve. The township was named after Lorenzo Solon Bull, who was the son of Isaac Bull, one of the first settlers. Purportedly, the selection of young Lorenzo's middle name was due to its derivation from the "father of democracy", Solon, the famous Athenian lawmaker of Ancient Greece. The early settlers faced challenges common to pioneers, but in Solon, drainage and wetlands issues complicated settlement and agriculture. Overcoming these obstacles, Solon Township became an arable farming area, producing corn and wheat crops and supporting dairy farms (including five cheese factories). By 1850, the population of Solon Township reached 1,034.

Because of nearby Cleveland's position as a national hub of the railroad industry, rail also contributed greatly to Solon's growth. In 1857, the Cleveland-Youngstown section of the Cleveland and Mahoning Railroad established a line running through Solon.

Laid out in a traditional New England plan, Solon, like many of the neighboring townships, established a public square in its town center. In conjunction with townships to the north, a north–south corridor was established through the town centers of Solon, Orange, and Mayfield townships (from south to north, respectively) and, accordingly, was named SOM Center Road (now Ohio 91). Solon Township included the current municipalities of the City of Solon and the villages of Bentleyville and Glenwillow. In 1927, Solon was incorporated as a village and later became a city in 1961, operated under the mayor-council form of government.

Solon was one of the first cities to use a comprehensive zoning plan and has been able to achieve a strong industrial base, while insulating its bedroom communities from industrial activities. Further, the city has primarily concentrated its commercial and retail districts in the town center, making them convenient to all residents. In addition to its planned use for corporate and residential areas, Solon has  of city parks and recreational area,  of Cleveland Metroparks (the South Chagrin Reservation) and three golf courses within its borders.

In 1991, the extension of a divided highway, US 422, was completed as an east–west corridor just north of its town center. US 422 enables easy access to many points throughout Northeast Ohio, providing a corridor extending from Cleveland through Solon and beyond Warren into Pennsylvania.

Geography

Solon is at  (41.389871, −81.442330).

Climate
Like other Great Lakes region cities, Solon lies in a humid continental climate zone (Köppen Dfa) and has four distinct seasons, from hot summers to cold and snowy winters.

Solon experiences relatively high precipitation (an average of  annually) due to lake effect and its presence on the western end of the North American snowbelt.

Surrounding communities
The city is bordered by Moreland Hills, Chagrin Falls, Bainbridge, Reminderville, Twinsburg, Glenwillow, Bedford Heights, and Orange (as shown in the graphic below).

Demographics

As of 2010, the median income for a household in the city was $96,965, and the median income for a family was $112,156. The per capita income for the city was $47,505. About 2.0% of families and 4.8% of the population were below the poverty line.

Of the city's population over age 25, 57.0% hold a bachelor's degree or higher.

In 2000, 90.8% spoke English, 1.9% Russian, 1.4% Chinese, 1.1% Spanish, and 0.8% German.

Solon has a large immigrant population. The success of Solon's public schools is cited as one reason for the diversity of its population.

2010 census
As of the census of 2010, there were 23,348 people, 8,352 households, and 6,769 families residing in the city. The racial makeup of the city was 77.5% White, 10.6% African American, 0.1% Native American, 10.0% Asian, 0.4% from other races, and 1.4% from two or more races. Hispanic or Latino of any race were 1.5% of the population.

There were 8,352 households, of which 41.5% had children under age 18 living with them, 68.7% were married couples living together, 9.4% had a female householder with no husband present, 2.9% had a male householder with no wife present, and 19.0% were non-families. 16.6% of all households were made up of individuals, and 7.2% had someone living alone who was 65 years of age or older. The average household size was 2.78 and the average family size was 3.13.

The median age in the city was 43.1 years. 27.8% of residents were under 18; 5.2% were between 18 and 24; 20.3% were from 25 to 44; 34.3% were from 45 to 64; and 12.4% were 65 or older. The gender makeup of the city was 48.7% male and 51.3% female.

Economy
In 1929, the Bready Cultimotor tractor company became the first industrial company to locate in Solon. Since then, Solon has served as home to many multinational companies, including several global and North American headquarters. Although Solon is a suburb of Cleveland, it has an employment base sufficient to support its residential population and thus should not be considered a bedroom community.

Today, according to city government authorities, Solon has major clusters of businesses in five manufacturing industries: electronic and electrical equipment, industrial and commercial machinery, measuring and controlling devices and instruments, chemicals and allied products, and fabricated metal products. Over 8,000, or 75%, of Solon's 10,700 manufacturing jobs are concentrated in these five sectors.

Major employers include: Nestlé (headquarters of Stouffer Foods), Swagelok, Pentair, Signature of Solon Country Club, Keithley Instruments and Arrow Electronics. Other well-known businesses include: the Cleveland Clinic, King Nut Company, Miles Farmers Market, and First Class Limos.

Wrap Tite, a small business in town that manufactures stretch wrap and other packing and shipping products, was given a $1.5 million Small Business Administration (SBA)-supported loan in summer 2011, a fact emphasized by Vice President Joseph Biden and SBA head Karen Mills when they visited Solon on September 20, 2011, to announce a $20 billion three-year commitment by 13 major banking chains to increase lending to small businesses in underserved communities.

The Robbins Company, a leading international manufacturer of tunnel boring machines founded in 1952, is headquartered in Solon. Robbins employs over 150 individuals in the city and has produced a number of industry innovations.

Top employers
According to Solon's 2017 Comprehensive Annual Financial Report, the top employers in the city are:

Culture

Performing arts
The Solon Center for the Arts offers classes in art, music, dance, and theater. The center holds a program for seniors entitled "Act II: Aging Creatively through the Arts," for those over 55 interested in theater or music.

The city is also home to the Solon Philharmonic Orchestra, and hosts an annual Young Artists Concerto Competition.

Historical society
Established in 1968 in the old Disciple Church, the Solon Historical Society maintains a museum with artifacts from the 1800s through the 1900s, many of which serve as memorials to the city founders. Many pieces in the museum include antique household and kitchen items, antique furniture, Solon Springs soda bottles, antique children's toys, school desks from the old school house, and many others. The museum is opened the second Sunday of every month.

Education

Solon City Schools

The majority of students from Solon and the neighboring village of Glenwillow are educated through the Solon City School District. The district has been consistently ranked as a top 10 school district in the state of Ohio, as well as receiving praise from publications such as Newsweek, and U.S. News & World Report. Solon Schools have also received honors such as the Red Quill and Red Quill Legacy awards for multiple years in a row from the ACT organization. Solon Schools have also received the National Blue Ribbon School recognition, considered to be one of the highest honors for American schools, many times over the past few decades. In 2017, Niche.com ranked the school district the best in the United States.

Solon High School educates approximately 1,600–1,700 students per school year, Solon Middle School and Orchard Middle School educate 700–900 students per school year each, and each elementary school educates 400–600 students per year, putting the district enrollment at approximately 4,700–5,000 students per school year.

The district contains six schools serving grades K–12 and one preschool:
 Solon High School (9–12)
 Solon Middle School (7–8)
 Orchard Middle School (5–6)
 Lewis Elementary School (K–4)
 Parkside Elementary School (K–4)
 Roxbury Elementary School (K–4)

The former Arthur Road Elementary School, which closed following the 2015–2016 school year, served as a public preschool and administrative building before being set to be demolished in 2022.

Private schools
St. Rita School is a private Catholic religious institution, associated with the St. Rita Roman Catholic Parish Church in Solon. The school offers preschool, elementary, upper elementary, and middle school programs. St. Rita School has also received National Blue Ribbon School designation from the United States government.

Solon is home to the Montessori school of Solon.

Infrastructure

Police department

As of 2014, the Solon Police Department consisted of 46 officers, 14 dispatchers, 16 correction officers, eight office staff, one animal warden, 19 auxiliary police, and six school guards. The police station, which is located off of Solon Road and open 24 hours, has several services that are divided into eight different departments, each handling responsibilities that are different from the other departments.

Healthcare
Solon is home to branches of the Cleveland Clinic, University Hospitals of Cleveland, and Akron Children's Hospital Health Systems.

Recycling program
Solon has a curbside single-stream recycling program. Once per month, the city also collects computers, auto batteries, heavy steel (license plates, bed frames, etc.), carpet padding, propane cylinders, fire extinguishers, liquids and solids such as paints, oil, household hazardous waste, pool chemicals, fertilizers, etc. The city also has a composting program. They collect leaves, grass clippings, etc., and turn it into compost that is then sold back to residents.

Notable people
 Steve Dettelbach (born 1965), current director of the Bureau of Alcohol, Tobacco, and Firearms, former U.S. Attorney for the Northern District of Ohio 
 Georgia T. Robertson (1852–1916), educator and author
 Phil Robinson (born 1980), state representative from Ohio's 6th district
 Evelyn Svec Ward (1921–1989), American fiber artist
 Elizabeth Lowe Watson (1842–1927), lecturer; religious and suffrage leader

References

Further reading
 Solon Historical Society., & Charles, C. W. (1992). Pictorial history of Solon, Ohio, 1820–1991. Marceline, MO: Heritage House Pub.
 Bard, N. P. (1970). Pioneers with web feet. Solon, OH: Solon Sesquicentennial Committee.

External links

Solon Chamber of Commerce

Cities in Cuyahoga County, Ohio
Populated places established in 1820
1820 establishments in Ohio
Cities in Ohio